Sebastián Gorčík (born September 5, 1995) is a Czech professional ice hockey player. He is currently playing for HC Karlovy Vary of the Czech Extraliga.

Gorčík made his Czech Extraliga debut playing with HC Karlovy Vary during the 2014–15 Czech Extraliga season.

References

External links

HC Karlovy Vary players
Czech ice hockey forwards
1995 births
Living people
People from Rýmařov
ESV Kaufbeuren players
Orli Znojmo players
VHK Vsetín players
Sportspeople from the Moravian-Silesian Region
Czech expatriate ice hockey players in Germany